Kasongo is a Congolese name that may refer to
Given name
Jean-Kasongo Banza (born 1974), Congolese football player 
Kasongo Ilunga, alleged Congolese politician 
Kasongo Munganga, Congolese politician and monetarist

Surname
Belux Bukasa Kasongo (born 1979), Congolese football player
Joseph Kasongo, Congolese politician 
Kabwe Kasongo (born 1970), Congolese football player 
Kabongo Kasongo (born 1994), Congolese football forward 
Ngandu Kasongo (born 1979), Congolese football player
Pierre Mwana Kasongo (born 1938), Congolese football player 
Kongo-language surnames